HMS Redmill may refer to more than one British ship of the Royal Navy:

 , a destroyer launched in 1916 and sold in 1921 that bore the name HMS Redmill while under construction until renamed Medina in 1915; see 
 , a frigate in service from 1943 to 1945

Royal Navy ship names